Hassan Abdulrahim Al-Buhashim Al-Sayed(born 1969) is a Qatari Judge of the Qatar International Court and Dispute Resolution Centre. 

He was educated at Kuwait University (LLB, 1993), the University of Jordan (LLM, 1997) and completed his PhD at the University of East Anglia in 2003, entitled "Towards liberalising government procurement in the Gulf Cooperation Council member states". He is an associate professor of law at Qatar University, having served as dean of the college of law there from 2007 to 2010. He previously practiced as a lawyer in Qatar specialising in constitutional law, administrative disputes and state contracts, and has been vice president of the Qatari Bar Association.

References

1969 births
Living people
Kuwait University alumni
University of Jordan alumni
Alumni of the University of East Anglia
Academic staff of Qatar University
Qatari lawyers
People from Doha